The Vision Bleak is a short 2-track extended play by the eponymous German gothic metal band The Vision Bleak. It was released through Prophecy Productions on 20 August 2003, to serve as a teaser for their then-upcoming debut studio album, The Deathship Has a New Captain. It contains two early versions of tracks that would ultimately appear on the album, "The Lone Night Rider" and "Elizabeth Dane".

Track listing

Personnel

The Vision Bleak
 Ulf Theodor Schwadorf (Markus Stock) – guitars, bass
 Allen B. Konstanz (Tobias Schönemann) – vocals, drums

Miscellaneous staff
 Martin Koller – production

References

External links
 The Vision Bleak's official website

The Vision Bleak albums
2003 EPs